HC Dnipryanka Kherson (ГК «Дніпрянка») is a women's handball club from Kherson in Ukraine. HC Dnipryanka competes in the Ukrainian Superleague.

European record

Team

Current squad 

Squad for the 2016–17 season

Goalkeepers
 Tetiana Chorniavska
 Valentyna Drembach
 Tetiana Kuzevanova

Wingers
RW
  Maryna Potseluieva
  Hanna Silvestrova
  Yuliia Tkachenko
LW 
  Kristina Hrechka
  Marharyta Hrechka
  Tetyana Popovych

Line Players 
  Anastasiia Holovko
  Svitlana Loboda
  Iana Reva
  Karolina Savchenko
  Daryna Surhan
Back players
LB
  Valeriia Kyryllova
CB 
  Katerina Kandybei
  Anastasia Sinchuk 
RB
  Alona Sorokina

External links
 
 EHF Club profile

Ukrainian handball clubs
Sport in Kherson
Handball clubs established in 1995
1995 establishments in Ukraine